Amrutalingampeta is a village in Eluru district of the Indian state of Andhra Pradesh. It is located in Pedapadu mandal of Eluru revenue division. The nearest railway stations are Vatlur and Nuzvid.

Demographics 
At the 2011 Census of India, Amrutalingampeta had a population of 1,096 (535 males and 561 females with a sex ratio of 1049 females per 1000 males). 96 children are in the age group of 0–6 years with sex ratio of 600. The average literacy rate was 73.40%.

References 

Villages in Eluru district